was a Japanese professional sumo wrestler from Sendai, Satsuma Province. He was the sport's 16th yokozuna, and the first to be officially listed as such on the banzuke ranking sheets, an act which strengthened the prestige of yokozuna as the highest level of achievement in professional sumo.

Early career
He began his career in Kyoto sumo, joining Tokinokoe stable in 1873. He was promoted to the top makuuchi division in 1879, and made sekiwake in September 1879, a tournament which was held under the joint auspices of the Kyoto and Osaka sumo organisations. He was persuaded by Uragoro Takasago, formerly of Osaka sumo, to join Tokyo sumo in his newly founded Takasago stable. He made his debut in a special makuuchi division rank in January 1882. He had a rapid rise, making ōzeki just seven tournaments later in January 1885. His rivals included stablemates Odate, Ichinoya and Konishiki. Nishinoumi fell to sekiwake in January 1886, despite recording a kachi-koshi winning score, as at the time a sekiwake on the east side of the banzuke with a better record could overtake an ōzeki on the same side. After winning a yūshō equivalent with an unbeaten 9–0 score in May 1889 he returned to ōzeki, and after another good 7–2 score in the next tournament he was awarded a yokozuna licence in March 1890.

Yokozuna
However, Nishinoumi's promotion caused a problem. Although he had been made a yokozuna, his rank was listed as haridashi ōzeki, below his rival ōzeki Konishiki Yasokichi I on the banzuke (the sumo wrestlers' hierarchy) for the May 1890 tournament. This was because of Konishiki's 8–0 unbeaten score in the previous tournament. Nishinoumi's name was literally shunted out to the side on the banzuke, and he complained about this to those in authority. To placate him, yokozuna was written on the banzuke for the first time in sumo history. It was a compromise specifically for him, but because of this the name yokozuna became an official rank for the first time after this dispute. In the top makuuchi division, he won 127 bouts and lost 37 bouts, recording a winning percentage of 77.4.

Retirement from sumo
Nishinoumi became an elder known as Izutsu after his retirement in January 1896, and became head coach of Izutsu stable. He produced several top wrestlers from Kagoshima Prefecture, amongst them the 25th yokozuna Nishinoumi Kajirō II (the great-grandfather of current Izutsu head Sakahoko) who succeeded him upon his death from heart failure in 1908.

Top division record

  
    
    
  
  
    
    
  
  
    
    
  
  
    
    
  
  
    
    
  
  
    
    
  
  
    
    
  
  
    
    
  
  
    
    
  
  
    
    
  
  
    
    
  
  
    
    
  
  
    
    
  
  
    
    
  
  
    
  

*Championships for the best record in a tournament were not recognized or awarded before the 1909 summer tournament and the above unofficial championships are historically conferred. For more information see yūshō.

See also

Glossary of sumo terms
List of past sumo wrestlers
List of yokozuna

References

1855 births
1908 deaths
Japanese sumo wrestlers
Yokozuna
Sumo people from Kagoshima Prefecture
19th-century wrestlers